Thomas Beimel (30 May 1967 – 29 June 2016) was a German composer, violist and musicologist.

Born in Essen, Beimel studied at the Folkwang Hochschule in his hometown, composition with Konrad Grahe and viola with Karin Wolff. He continued his studies from 1988 to 1992, instrumental pedagogy (Instrumentalpädagogik) at the Hochschule für Musik im Rheinland. He cofounded in 1989 with Ortrud Kegel, Karola Pasquay and  the ensemble Partita Radicale, which also plays free improvisation. His research was devoted from 1991 to new music in Romania and Eastern Europe, and from 2003 also to Latin America.

In 1997, began composition studies with Myriam Marbe in Bucharest. His opera Idyllen after Jean Paul was premiered at the Opernhaus Wuppertal. In 2001, Beimel's music for a stage production of Kafka's In der Strafkolonie was first performed, again in Wuppertal. He was also composer in residence of the Bavarian chamber orchestra Bayerisches Kammerorchester. He died in Wuppertal.

Works 
 Zwei Augen/Sternverdunklung, piano quartet, 1994–95
 del amor que no se deja ver, for bass, mixed choir, string quartet, piano and accordion, 1995
 Die Affäre Klytaimestra, incidental music, 1995
 del amor imprevisto, for alto flute, alto, cello, percussion and piano, 1996
 L'arrivée à cythère, for alto flute and percussion, 1998
 Saeta, for six solo women's voices, 1998
 Insekten: Kinder des Lichts, paraphrase of Scriabins's Piano Sonata No. 10, for four accordions, 1998
 Idyllen, musical scenes after Jean Paul, chamber opera, 1998–99
 Okeanós, concerto for amplified cello and orchestra, 1999–2002
 …and what of the sleep of animals…, horn quartet, 2000
 …calling, from far away…, for vibraphon, 2000
 melos, for timpani, 2000
 mneme, string quartet, 2000
 tu aliento, for mezzo-soprano, 2001
 petite chanson d’amour, for voice and piano, 2001
 In der Strafkolonie, music for a staging of Kafka's short story, 2001
 faltenbalg, for five accordion ensembles, 2001
 tanâvar, for mezzo-soprano, alto flute and trombone, 2002
 auf deinen wangen / goldene tauben, after Else Lasker-Schüler for mezzo-soprano, 2002
 cólera, string quartet, 2002
 sumak, for two violas, 2003
 aynaki / deine augen, for mezzo-soprano, 2003
 veni creator spiritus, for mezzo-soprano and countertenor, 2003
 tinieblas, for accordion trio, 2003–05
 soledades, for flûte de voix (or tenor recorder), 2003
 sicut cervus, for mixed choir, timpani and trombone quartet, 2004
 (no hay) consuelo, for mezzo-soprano (or trumpet) and string trio, 2004
 cantus, for mixed choir, 2004
 schrammeln, for mezzo-soprano, 2005
 cucurucucú, for horn, harp and two percussionists, 2005
 echos, for two percussionists, 2005
 soave sia il vento, paraphrase of Mozart's terzettino from Così fan tutte, 2005
 zeitlicher rat, for chamber ensemble, 2005
 hasret, for mezzo-soprano, viola and percussion, 2006
 et in arcadia ego…, for oboe and percussion, 2006
 nacht…, for tenor and mixed choir, 2006
 hanacpachap, for mezzo-soprano, accordion and orgelpositiv, 2006
 Vom guten Ton. Die Welt ist voll Geplapper, music theatre for four voices, four wind instruments and plucking orchestra, 2012
 im anfang war das wort for mixed choir and brass, 2016

References

External links 
 
 

1967 births
2016 deaths
20th-century classical composers
20th-century German composers
20th-century German male musicians
20th-century German musicologists
21st-century classical composers
21st-century German composers
21st-century German male musicians
21st-century German musicologists
German classical composers
German classical violists
German contemporary classical composers
German male classical composers
Musicians from Essen
20th-century violists
21st-century violists